The 1992 Calgary Stampeders finished in 1st place in the West Division with a 13–5 record and won the Grey Cup for the first time since 1971, ending the longest drought of any team at that time.

Offseason

CFL Draft

Preseason

 June 25 game against Toronto was played at Civic Stadium in Portland, Oregon.

Regular season

Season Standings

Season schedule

1992 CFL All-Stars

Offence 
 QB – Doug Flutie
 SB – Allen Pitts
 OG – Rocco Romano

Defence 
 DT – Will Johnson
 CB – Junior Thurman
 DB – Darryl Hall

1992 Western All-Stars

Offence 
 QB – Doug Flutie
 SB – Allen Pitts
 OG – Rocco Romano

Defence 
 DE – Will Johnson
 LB – Alondra Johnson
 LB – Matt Finlay
 CB – Junior Thurman
 DB – Darryl Hall

Special teams 
 K – Mark McLoughlin

1992 CFL Awards 
 CFL's Most Outstanding Player Award – Doug Flutie (QB)
 CFL's Coach of the Year – Wally Buono

Playoffs

West Final

Grey Cup

References

Calgary Stampeders seasons
N. J. Taylor Trophy championship seasons
Grey Cup championship seasons
Calg